Carex stenoptila, known as riverbank sedge, is a species of sedge native to North America.

References

stenoptila
Flora of North America